Rocky III is a 1982 American sports drama film written, directed by, and starring Sylvester Stallone. The film is the sequel to Rocky II (1979) and the third installment in the Rocky film series. It also stars Talia Shire, Burt Young, Carl Weathers, and Burgess Meredith. In the film, Rocky Balboa (Stallone) faces stiff competition from Clubber Lang (Mr. T), a powerful new contender, and turns to his old adversary Apollo Creed (Weathers) to help him train.

Development of the film began soon after the release of its predecessor. Stallone began a strict diet and workout regimen in preparation for Rocky III. Despite the returns of the original cast being secured quickly, casting for Lang proved difficult, with real boxers Joe Frazier and Earnie Shavers attached to the project at various points. Mr. T was hired in 1981 after winning America's Best Bouncer, and the film is considered his breakthrough role. Rocky III is the first film in the franchise not solely distributed by United Artists, due to the company's merger with Metro-Goldwyn-Mayer in 1981.

Rocky III was released in the United States on May 28, 1982, by MGM/UA Entertainment Co.. The film received mixed reviews from critics, with praise for its action sequences and music but criticism for its screenplay, with some critics deeming the film unnecessary. Rocky III grossed $270 million worldwide, surpassing its predecessors to become the then-highest grossing film in the franchise, and the fourth highest grossing film at the domestic box office and the second highest grossing film of 1982 worldwide. Its theme song, "Eye of the Tiger", became a hit single and received an Academy Award nomination for Best Original Song. The sequel, Rocky IV, was released in 1985.

Plot
In 1981, five years after winning the world heavyweight championship against Apollo Creed, Rocky Balboa has had a string of ten successful title defenses. His fame, wealth, and celebrity profile have increased, leading him to participate in an exhibition charity event against professional wrestler Thunderlips. Rocky's manager, Mickey Goldmill, worriedly eyes a young and powerful contender rapidly rising through the ranks, James "Clubber" Lang. While unveiling a statue of himself at the stairway by the Philadelphia Museum of Art just prior to announcing his retirement, Rocky is publicly challenged by Lang, now the number-one contender. Lang accuses Rocky of intentionally accepting challenges from lesser opponents and even makes a sexually suggestive comment toward Rocky's wife Adrian. A furious Rocky accepts Lang's challenge on the spot. However, Mickey initially wants no part of it.

Pressed by Rocky, Mickey confesses that he handpicked the opponents for Rocky's title defenses in order to spare him from another beating of the kind that Creed gave him in their rematch. He explains that Lang is young and powerful, and most of all he's "hungry"; by contrast Rocky is "civilized" and no longer has the stamina and strength to fight a boxer of Lang's caliber. Rocky, shattered by the realization that all of his fights have been stacked in his favor, convinces Mickey to work with him for one last fight. Despite his promise to Mickey to "live in the gym", Rocky insists on allowing the public to watch him train in a crowded hotel ballroom filled with distractions. In contrast, Lang trains alone with ruthless determination and vigor.

Lang and Rocky meet at Philadelphia's Spectrum on August 15, 1981. Pandemonium erupts backstage as Mickey is violently shoved by Lang, resulting in a fatal heart attack. Distraught, Rocky wants to call the match off, but Mickey urges him on while he receives medical care in the dressing room. Rocky's lack of preparation is worsened by his anger over Mickey, preventing him from fully concentrating on the fight. The match begins with Rocky pounding Lang with several huge blows looking for an early knockout, but Lang quickly recovers and takes charge, dominating Rocky and finishing him off with a haymaker left hook in the second round, winning the world heavyweight championship. After the match, Rocky tells a dying Mickey that the match ended in a second round knockout without saying who the victor was. Mickey dies right after he says "I love ya, kid". Rocky, lapsing into severe depression, mourns over Mickey's death.

Stopping by Mickey's closed gym, the forlorn Rocky encounters his former rival, Apollo Creed, who witnessed the match as a guest analyst. Creed offers to help train Rocky for a rematch against Lang in exchange for a future favor, which Rocky accepts. Apollo then takes Rocky to the gym where he once trained, Tough Gym in Los Angeles. Apollo quickly becomes frustrated by Rocky's lack of effort, as he is still haunted by nightmares of Lang and unable to train without Mickey by his side. However, Rocky regains his focus after Adrian helps him come to terms with Mickey's death. Apollo and his manager, Tony "Duke" Evers, infuse Rocky's undisciplined brawling style with more of Apollo's trademark footwork, skill and speed, rebuilding him into an entirely new fighter.

After months of training, the rematch takes place at Madison Square Garden in New York City. Apollo lends Rocky the American flag trunks that he wore during their first match. At the outset of the match, Rocky sprints from his corner, battering Lang with a level of skill and spirit that no one ever expected. Rocky completely dominates the first round, leaving Lang enraged and bewildered after the bell. Lang gains the upper hand in the second round, and Rocky adopts an entirely different strategy that angers and confuses Apollo by intentionally taking a beating from Lang, even getting knocked down twice, all the while taunting Lang that he cannot knock him out. By the third round, Lang, who is used to winning matches swiftly with knockouts in the early rounds, loses his temper and starts throwing punches wildly as Rocky taunts him, gradually running out of stamina. With Lang rattled and vulnerable, Rocky strikes back with a flurry of punches, culminating in a brutal knockout to reclaim the heavyweight championship.

Afterwards, Rocky fulfills Apollo's favor — a third, private rematch with him at Mighty Mick's Gym. The film concludes without showing the result, but freezes into an oil painting of two boxers simultaneously throwing the first punch, showing two equally skilled athletes facing each other not as rivals, but as friends.

Cast
 
 Sylvester Stallone as Robert "Rocky" Balboa, "The Italian Stallion": the heavyweight champion of the world who continues to defend his title against other fighters. When Lang challenges Rocky and wins, the public cries for a rematch. As Rocky is reluctant following Mickey's death, former rival, Apollo Creed, befriends and trains The Italian Stallion in his preparation to take on Clubber Lang.
 Talia Shire as Adrian Pennino Balboa: Rocky's wife and supporter throughout his boxing career.
 Burt Young as Paulie Pennino: Rocky's best friend and brother-in-law.
 Carl Weathers as Apollo Creed: The former Heavyweight Champion and Rocky's former arch-rival, who agrees to train him after the death of Mickey. In the process, the two become very close friends.
 Burgess Meredith as Michael "Mickey" Goldmill: Rocky's friend, manager and trainer, who unexpectedly dies; a former bantamweight fighter from the 1920s and the owner of the boxing gym where Rocky trained for his first fight against Apollo.
 Tony Burton as Tony "Duke" Evers: Apollo Creed's father figure, friend, trainer, and manager, who helps Apollo train Rocky.
 Mr. T as James "Clubber" Lang: The underdog challenger who beats Rocky in a championship fight, amidst the unexpected death of Mickey. The public's general dislike and lack of respect for him as Heavyweight Champion of the World leads to a rematch with Rocky. Orphaned at an early age, Lang spent most of his childhood on the streets of Chicago's South Side as well as spending time in orphanages and juvenile facilities. As an adult, Clubber was sent to prison for five years for one count of a felony and/or assault charge. While serving his sentence, he discovered his talent as a boxer. Boxing was a way to let out his frustration, which leads to the events of Rocky III.
 Ina Fried as Robert "Rocky" Balboa, Jr.: Rocky and Adrian's only child.
 Hulk Hogan as "Thunderlips": The current world wrestling champion, who fights Rocky in a charity event.

In addition to the main cast several others had cameo appearances. Bill Baldwin and Stu Nahan returned as the fight commentators for the two Rocky-Lang fights. Veteran ring announcer Jimmy Lennon was the ring announcer for the first Lang fight, while boxing judge Marty Denkin was the referee. Lou Filippo returned for his third appearance as a referee during the second Lang fight. Dennis James (Price Is Right) and Jim Healy appeared as the commentators for the Rocky–Thunderlips match, while LeRoy Neiman was the guest ring announcer. Jim Hill was a TV announcer. A then unknown Morgan Freeman auditioned unsuccessfully for the role of Lang's trainer. Footage of Stallone's guest appearance on The Muppet Show was incorporated in the opening sequence, with Jim Henson dubbing Kermit the Frog's announcement that the episode's guest was Rocky Balboa, rather than Stallone.

Production

Development and writing

For the role of Clubber Lang, two real world-class heavyweight boxers were first considered: Joe Frazier and Earnie Shavers. Both were about the same height as Sylvester Stallone and had the powerful physique he was looking for, but, according to casting director Rhonda Young, Frazier had a stuttering problem, while Shavers had a high-pitched voice which would have undermined the character's menacing presence. After looking far and wide (even going to prisons in the hope of finding a suitable black antagonist), Rhonda Young stumbled upon a television program on NBC, America's Toughest Bouncer, showcasing a sports competition, and was mesmerized by the winner's physical prowess as well as his charisma. She then called the producer, Dan Ohlmeyer, to ask him about "the man with the mohawk". It turned out that not only was Mr. T a perfect fit, but he also proved tremendously determined to give the best possible performance right from the first screen test, for what would be his breakout role.

In preparation for film, Stallone claims to have got his body fat percentage down to his all-time low of 2.6% and weighed 155 lbs. He stated that he ate only ten egg whites and a piece of toast a day, having a fruit every third day. His training consisted of a two-mile jog in the morning followed by two hours of weight training, a nap during the afternoon followed by 18 rounds of sparring, another weight training session, and finishing the day with a swim.

Music

Soundtrack

 "Eye of the Tiger" (by Survivor) – 3:53
 "Take You Back (Tough Gym)" – 1:48
 "Pushin'" – 3:10
 "Decision" – 3:20
 "Mickey" – 4:42
 "Take You Back" – 3:37
 "Reflections" – 2:05
 "Gonna Fly Now" – 2:52
 "Adrian" – 1:42
 "Conquest" – 4:40
Personnel
 Frank Stallone – vocals (2, 3, 6)
 DeEtta Little, Nelson Pigford – vocals (8)
 Mike Lang – piano (5)
 Ray Pizzi – saxophone (3)
 Jerry Hey – trumpet (3)
 Vincent DeRosa – French horn (5)
 Henry Sigismonti – brass
 Rich Perissi – brass
 Arthur Maebe – brass
 Dave Duke – brass
 Paul Neuffer – brass

The version of "Eye of the Tiger" that appears in the film is actually a demo—the "finished" version is what appears on the soundtrack. Also missing from the soundtrack is the instrumental version of the song played when Rocky is training in Apollo's old gym.

A re-release Rocky III: Original Motion Picture Score CD was released on July 23, 1996

Chart positions

Reception

Box office
Rocky III was an enormous box office success and surpassed the gross of its predecessor. The film grossed $16,015,408 in its opening weekend and earned $125,049,125 during its North American theatrical run, becoming the fourth highest-grossing film of 1982; its worldwide box-office earnings stand at around $270 million. Roger Ebert and Gene Siskel attributed the film's success to the positive reaction from critics and audiences towards Rocky II and the production team's "quality control" of that film. Siskel stated "if you want a hugely successful series, then make sure that the second one is a winner."

Critical response
Rocky III holds a 67% rating on Rotten Tomatoes based on 42 reviews, with an average of 5.7/10. The film's consensus reads, "It's noticeably subject to the law of diminishing returns, but Rocky III still has enough brawny spectacle to stand in the ring with the franchise's better entries". On Metacritic the film has a score of 57 out of 100 based on reviews from 10 critics, indicating "mixed or average reviews". The film is one of the few which has received the rare A+ grade from audiences surveyed by CinemaScore.

Gene Siskel gave the film two-and-a-half stars out of four and wrote, "Sorry to say this, but there's not anything new in Rocky III, and we sit there wondering why it exists." He added that "we see nothing new about Rocky's character, except that the tender side of his soul, which made him so appealing, is now virtually missing. Rocky Balboa in Rocky III is no longer likable." Pauline Kael of The New Yorker stated, "The first Rocky was primitive in a relatively innocent way. This picture is primitive, but it's also shrewd and empty and inept." Sheila Benson of the Los Angeles Times wrote, "Somehow, Sylvester Stallone has kicked life into what you might imagine is a pretty tired Rocky Balboa and has gotten him up on his feet again ... Rocky III works, possibly even better than numbers I and II." Rita Kempley of The Washington Post called it "as much fun as ever, a ground-meat-and-potatoes movie, with guys beating hell out of each other to a disco beat." Tom Milne of The Monthly Film Bulletin wrote, "Starting off with a replay of our hero's second miraculous return from the dead to win the championship back at the end of Rocky II—itself a virtual repeat from the original Rocky—Rocky III soon demonstrates that it has nothing to offer but more of the same ... There are fleeting moments, thanks chiefly to a personable performance from Carl Weathers, but the time has surely come for Rocky Balboa to take the final count."

Accolades

Year-end lists
The film is recognized by American Film Institute in these lists:
 2004: AFI's 100 Years...100 Songs:	
 "Eye of the Tiger" – Nominated

Other media

Sequel

A sequel titled Rocky IV, was released in November 1985.

Rocky statue in Philadelphia

A bronze statue of Rocky, called "ROCKY", was commissioned by Sylvester Stallone and created by A. Thomas Schomberg in 1981. Three statues were created, and one was placed on the top of the steps of the Philadelphia Museum of Art for the filming of Rocky III. After filming was complete, a furious debate erupted in Philadelphia between the Art Museum and the City's Art Commission over the meaning of "art". Claiming the statue was not "art" but rather a "movie prop" the city considered various alternative locations and settled upon the front of the Spectrum in South Philadelphia. It was later returned to the Art Museum where it was used in the filming of Rocky V, as well as Mannequin and Philadelphia. Afterward, it was again moved to the front of the Spectrum. The statue was returned to the bottom of the museum's stairs on 8 September 2006. The steps leading to the east entrance of the Philadelphia Museum of Art are also known as “The Rocky Steps.” A similar statue is located in Žitište, Serbia.

Novelization
A novelization by Robert E. Hoban was published by Ballantine Books in 1982.

Video game
A video game based on the film was released in 1983, titled Rocky Super Action Boxing, designed by Coleco and released for ColecoVision. Players can play as either Rocky Balboa or Clubber Lang either against the computer in a one player game, or against each other in a "Head to Head" two player mode. In 1987, Rocky, based on the first four Rocky films, was released. In 2002, Rocky was released, based on the first five Rocky films. In 2004, Rocky Legends, based on the first four Rocky films, was released.

References

Notes

External links 

 Official Rocky Anthology Site
 
 
 
 
 
 

1982 films
1980s English-language films
1980s sports drama films
American sequel films
American sports drama films
American boxing films
Films set in 1982
Films set in the Las Vegas Valley
Films set in Los Angeles
Films set in New York City
Films set in Philadelphia
Films shot in the Las Vegas Valley
Films shot in Los Angeles
Films shot in New York City
Films shot in Pennsylvania
Professional wrestling films
Rocky (film series) films
United Artists films
Films scored by Bill Conti
Films directed by Sylvester Stallone
Films produced by Robert Chartoff
Films produced by Irwin Winkler
Films with screenplays by Sylvester Stallone
Films about Italian-American culture
1982 drama films
1980s American films